Januszówka may refer to the following places:
Januszówka, Łęczna County in Lublin Voivodeship (east Poland)
Januszówka, Łuków County in Lublin Voivodeship (east Poland)
Januszówka, Masovian Voivodeship (east-central Poland)
Januszówka, Greater Poland Voivodeship (west-central Poland)